Santa Rosa is a city in the center-north of the province of Mendoza, Argentina, located on the northern shore of the Tunuyán River, by National Route 7, south-east from the provincial capital Mendoza.

References
 

Populated places in Mendoza Province